Georges Grassal de Choffat or Hugues Rebell (27 October 1867 in Nantes – 6 March 1905 in Paris) was a French author. He wrote against Christianity and professed paganism while remaining a Catholic. An exponent of Friedrich Nietzsche, he was associated with the right-wing nationalist group .

Rebell wrote a number of pornographic works under the group pseudonym "Jean de Villiot", a prolific contributor to early 20th century French spanking literature, published by Charles Carrington.

Rebell is often dismissed as a failed author of pornography, remembered for only one title,  (1902), which won the Prix Nocturne in 1966. He was also known as a polemicist of royalty because of his  (1894), which treated the three aristocracies based on family name, money, and talent.

He wrote articles for the journals La Cocarde and Le Soleil, which were included in a collection of writings published in 1994 under the title De mon balcon. He wrote a defence of Oscar Wilde in the August issue of the literary magazine Mercure de France in 1895.

References

Sources
 Marius Boisson, Hugues Rebell, intime, Paris, Seheur, 1930.
 Hubert Juin, Écrivains de l’avant-siècle, Paris, Seghers, 1972.
 Thierry Rodange, Le diable quitte la table ou La vie passionnée d'Hugues Rebell, Paris, Mercure de France, 1994.

External links
 
 

1867 births
1905 deaths
People affiliated with Action Française
French male non-fiction writers
French modern pagans
French Roman Catholics
Modern pagan writers